The emFire Collection: Mixed, Unmixed & Remixed is a collection of remixes of Sasha's tracks "Coma," "Park it in Shade," "Who Killed Sparky?" and "Mongoose."  The second disc contains edits of these tracks, as well a continuous mix of Sasha's score from the surf film New Emissions of Light & Sound mixed into one song.  This score won an award from the action sports film festival X Dance Awards.  Four tracks from The emFire Collection were released on a two 12" vinyl records as The emFire Collection: Club Remixes.

Track list

Disc 1
 "Coma (Slam Soma Coma mix)" – 5:36
 "Park it in the Shade (Audion Deep Steeple mix)" – 12:20
 "Who Killed Sparky? (Radio Slave's Brooklyn dub mix)" – 6:50
 "Mongoose (The Field's Floating mix)" – 3:22
 "Coma (Slam Paragraph mix)" – 7:53
 "Park it in the Shade (Audion Ain't Got No Friends mix)" – 8:37
 "Who Killed Sparky? (Radio Slave's Panorama garage mix)" – 12:13
 "Mongoose (The Field's disco mix)" – 9:18

Disc 2
 "Coma (Spangled Rubdub)" – 5:42
 "Park it in the Shade (Exclusive emFire edit)" – 5:32
 "Who Killed Sparky? (Exclusive emFire edit)" – 5:37
 "Mongoose (Exclusive emFire edit)" – 5:04
 "New Emissions of Light & Sound (film score)" – 40:52
 "Gothic Mood" – 1:58
 "Sparky" – 2:19
 "Rooski" – 1:36
 "Lonely Place" – 3:43
 "Arthill" – 2:29
 "Coma" – 7:46
 "Celestial" – 2:30
 "Electromania" – 3:39
 "Marketplace" – 5:59
 "Stars" – 5:26

References

External links

Sasha (DJ) albums
2008 compilation albums
2008 remix albums